Bonadelle Ranchos  is an unincorporated community and census-designated place (CDP) in Madera County, California, United States. As of the 2020 census, it had a population of 5,497. Prior to 2020, the community was part of the Bonadelle Ranchos-Madera Ranchos CDP.

Geography
It is bordered to the southeast by the Madera Ranchos CDP.

References

Census-designated places in California
Census-designated places in Madera County, California
Unincorporated communities in California
Unincorporated communities in Madera County, California